Illumination! is a 1964 album by the Elvin Jones/Jimmy Garrison Sextet, featuring John Coltrane Quartet bandmates Jones, Garrison and pianist McCoy Tyner playing with alto saxophonist Sonny Simmons, flautist Prince Lasha and baritone saxophonist Charles Davis.

Reception 
Allmusic's Scott Yanow describes the band's performance in his review of the Illumination! as "the music ranges from advanced hard bop to freer sounds that still swing".

Track listing 
"Nuttin' Out Jones" (Lasha) – 5:36
"Oriental Flower" (Tyner) – 3:49
"Half and Half" (Charles Davis) – 6:28
"Aborigine Dance in Scotland" (Simmons) – 4:12
"Gettin' on Way" (Garrison) – 5:14
"Just Us Blues" (Davis) – 5:55

Personnel 
 Elvin Jones – drums
 Jimmy Garrison – bass
 McCoy Tyner – piano
 Sonny Simmons – alto saxophone, English Horn
 Charles Davis – baritone saxophone
 (William) Prince Lasha – clarinet, flute

References

External links 
Illumination at Discogs

Elvin Jones albums
Jimmy Garrison albums
Hard bop albums
Free jazz albums
Impulse! Records albums
1964 albums
Albums produced by Bob Thiele
Albums recorded at Van Gelder Studio